Charles Vilas Truax (February 1, 1887 – August 9, 1935) was an American politician who served one term as a U.S. Representative from Ohio from 1933 to 1935.

Biography 
Born on a farm near Sycamore, Ohio, Truax attended the public schools and graduated from Sycamore High School.
He engaged in the implement business, and afterward, in agricultural pursuits.
He was editor of the Swine World magazine from 1916 to 1921.
He was appointed director of agriculture of Ohio by Governor A. Victor Donahey in 1923 and served until 1929.
He was an unsuccessful candidate for election to the United States Senate in 1928.
He engaged in the life insurance business in Columbus, Ohio, in 1928.
He was elected as a Democrat to the Seventy-third and Seventy-fourth Congresses and served from March 4, 1933, until his death in Washington, D.C., August 9, 1935.
He was interred in Pleasant View Cemetery, Sycamore, Ohio.

See also
 List of United States Congress members who died in office (1900–49)

Sources

1887 births
1935 deaths
People from Sycamore, Ohio
Politicians from Columbus, Ohio
State cabinet secretaries of Ohio
20th-century American politicians
Democratic Party members of the United States House of Representatives from Ohio